Bedum is a former municipality and a town in the northeastern Netherlands. On 1 January 2019 it merged with the municipalities of De Marne, Eemsmond and Winsum to form the new municipality Het Hogeland.

Bedum is the site of three supermarkets, several pubs, and a leaning church tower, dubbed "the leaning tower of Bedum". Footballer Arjen Robben was born in Bedum (23 January 1984). 

Bedum has a railway station - Bedum railway station.

The leaning tower

Bedum's 36-metre tower of the St Walfridus church has been calculated as now leaning at a greater angle than the Leaning Tower of Pisa. If both towers were the same height, Bedum's would have a greater displacement by 6 cm.

Former population centres 
Bedum
Noordwolde
Onderdendam
Zuidwolde
Ellerhuizen
Westerdijkshorn

Notable people

 Arjen Robben, professional footballer

Gallery

References

External links

Official website

Het Hogeland
Former municipalities of Groningen (province)
Populated places in Groningen (province)
Municipalities of the Netherlands disestablished in 2019